Marina Guseva (also known as Marina Romanko and Marina Nechaeva; born 5 August 1986) is a Russian chess player who holds the titles of International Master (IM) and Woman Grandmaster (WGM). In 2009, she was a member of the Russian team that won the silver medal in the Women's World Team Chess Championship in Ningbo and gold in the Women's European Team Chess Championship in Novi Sad. Guseva competed in the Women's World Chess Championship in 2010, 2012, 2017 and 2018.

She won the women's open event at the Moscow Open (ru) for two consecutive years, in 2012 and 2013. Guseva won the Russian Women's Championship Higher League, the qualifier for the Russian Women's Superfinal, in 2015 and 2017.

In the European Chess Club Cup for Women, playing for team Ugra, Guseva won the individual gold medal as the best player on board 4 in 2014.

References

External links
Marina Nechaeva chess games at 365Chess.com
Marina Romanko chess games at 365Chess.com

Marina Guseva team chess record at Olimpbase.org
Marina Romanko team chess record at Olimpbase.org
Marina Nechaeva team chess record at Olimpbase.org

1986 births
Living people
People from Fryazino
Chess International Masters
Chess woman grandmasters
Russian female chess players